Acer Aspire (stylized as Λspire or ΛSPIRE) is a series of personal computers by Acer Inc. aimed at the casual household user or for small business use. The Aspire series covers both desktop computers and laptops. Acer developed the series in order to cover from essentials to high performances.

Many of the Aspire laptops, such as model 8920G, have built in Blu-ray drives, 5.1 audio outputs and transflective displays. Acer was the first to include these drives in laptops. Most Aspire laptops have water-resistant screens, such as the 1410 and the 5741 Z. 

In 2007, Acer introduced the Gemstone series that marked a milestone in the Acer Aspire line.

As with many Windows laptops, different models may have different specification in different parts of the world, but most of the Aspire laptops, produced from 2005 to 2012, were developed with standardized modular internal design (known as Intel Common Building Block).

Aspire series 
List of Acer Aspire series models

The Aspire series was introduced in 2017 with four main models: 1, 3, 5 and 7.

Despite similarities with the Aspire E series, in many regions, the Aspire series is sold alongside the Aspire E series.

In 2018, the Aspire 6 was launched exclusively for Malaysia. The Aspire 6 is simply an Aspire 5 with a Captain America inspired aesthetics.

The Aspire 5 was originally launched with Intel Kaby Lake processors (i5-7200u and i7-7500u) and then was updated with Kaby Lake R processors (i5-8250u and i7-8550u) and more recently updated with Whisky Lake processors (i3-8145u, i5-8265u and i7-8565u) which came along with a redesign which involved slimmer bezels but dedicated maintenance panels for RAM and storage was omitted.
  More recent products such as the A715-74G and A715-75G feature a choice between the Coffee Lake 9th Gen Intel Core i5 and i7 processors, or the AMD Ryzen 3 and 5 processors.

Aspire E series 
List of Acer Aspire E series models
The Acer's Aspire E series also contains the Aspire ES sub series. The Aspire E comes with either a 14" or 15.6" 16:9 display named E14 and E15 respectively. The Aspire ES comes with either an 11.6" or 14" 16:9 display named ES11 and ES14 respectively.

The Aspire E series has been updated annually with newer Intel Processors. The Aspire E series is currently offered with Intel 8th generation Intel Core i series processors but has been offered with 4th, 5th, 6th and 7th generation Intel Core i series processors.

The Aspire E15 and Aspire 5 are similar but different.

The Aspire E15 weighs 5.27 lb and its dimensions are: 15.02" x 10.20" x 1.19". It has a SD Card slot, 2x USB 3.0 Type-A ports, 1x USB 2.0 Type-A port, RJ-45 Ethernet network port, HDMI Output, 1x USB 3.1 Type-C port and 1x VGA Port.

Aspire F series 
List of Acer Aspire F series models
The Acer's Aspire F15 is a 15-inch laptop.

Aspire M series 
List of Acer Aspire M series models
This sub-series has since been discontinued. Its unofficial successor is the Acer Swift series.

Aspire One

Acer Aspire One is a line of Aspire subcompact notebooks (netbooks) similar to the Asus EEE.

Aspire P series
List of Acer Aspire P series models
 P3-131
 P3-171

Aspire P3 
The Acer Aspire P3 is an 11.6-inch IPS LCD textured titanium-alloy maid ultrabook with an Intel Core i3-3229Y 1.4 GHz processor for i3 models and Intel Core i5-3329Y 1.5 GHz processor for i5 Models, 128 GB Solid State Drive, Bluetooth and Wi-Fi connectivity in 9.9 mm thin profile and a 2 or 4 GB of RAM. It also has one ventilation fan inside to cool the ultrabook when it is heavily used. This ultrabook was listed as a top-5 hybrid convertible laptop of 2013 by TechRadar.com.

Aspire R series 
List of Acer Aspire R series models

Aspire R 11 

The Acer Aspire R 11 (model R3-131-...) is an 11-inch convertible (2-in-1) laptop with a mainstream folding design.

Aspire R 14 
The Acer Aspire R 14 (model R3-471T-...) is a 14-inch convertible (2-in-1) laptop with a mainstream folding design, similar to the Lenovo Yoga 3 14 laptop. It has a display resolution of 1,366x7,68, and comes with 5th generation Broadwell Processors, a 1 TB HDD, and 8 GB of RAM.

Aspire R7 
The Acer Aspire R7 (model R7-572-...) is a 15.6-inch convertible (2-in-1) laptop with a single-hinge "Ezel" folding design. It has a display resolution of 1,920x1,080 and N-Trig DuoSense technology stylus support. It comes with 4th generation Haswell Processors, a 1 TB HDD, and 8 GB of RAM.

Aspire R 13 
The Acer Aspire (model R7-371t-...) is a 13.3" convertible (2-in-1) laptop with a double-hinge "Ezel" folding design. It has two available display resolutions of 1,920x1,080 or 2,560x1,440, and Synaptics stylus support. It comes with either 4th generation Haswell, 5th generation Broadwell Processors or 6th generation Skylake processors, solid state hard drives in sizes of 128, 256, or 512 GB, and 8 GB of RAM.

Aspire R 15 

The Acer Aspire R 15 (model R5-571T-...) is a 15.6 inch convertible (2-in-1) laptop with a mainstream folding design.

Aspire S series 
List of Acer Aspire S series models

Aspire S3 
The Acer Aspire S3 is a 13.3-inch Ultrabook with an Intel Core 1.6 GHz processor, 320 GB hard drive, a media card reader. Moreover, it has an integrated Intel HD Graphics 3000-chip and four gigabytes of RAM. Overall, the Ultrabook weighs 2.98 pounds.

Aspire S5 
The Acer Aspire S5 is a 13.3-Inch Ultrabook, which the company says is the world's thinnest Ultrabook. It is just 15mm-thick and so two millimeters thinner than the MacBook Air. It weighs 2.97 pounds and includes an Intel Ivy Bridge processor, 8 GB of DDR3 RAM, SSD storage for speed and increased shock resistance plus professionally tuned Dolby Home Theater v4.

Aspire S7 
The Acer Aspire S7 is a 13.3-inch ultrabook, a successor to the Aspire S5. It uses the same aluminum frame wrapping a pearly white plastic and Gorilla Glass encasement and is able to bend backwards 180 degrees and lie flat. It weighs roughly less than 1.3 kg and includes an Intel Ivy Bridge processor, 8 GB of DDR3 RAM, SSD storage for speed and increased shock resistance plus professionally tuned Dolby Home Theater v4.

Aspire S13 
The Acer Aspire S13 is a 13.3-inch ultrabook, a successor to the Aspire S7. The computer has an Intel Core i5 dual-core processor, 1080p display, SSD storage, USB-C port, and 8GB of ram.

Aspire Timeline series  

Acer Aspire Timeline is a discontinued sub-line of the Aspire series which consisted of ultrabooks. The indirect successor to the Aspire Timeline's are the Acer Swift lineup.

Aspire V Nitro series 
List of Acer Aspire V Nitro series models

Aspire V series 
List of Acer Aspire V series models

The Acer Aspire V series consists of the Acer Aspire V, Acer Aspire V3, Acer Aspire V5, Acer Aspire V 13 and Acer Aspire V15.

Aspire V5 

The Acer Aspire V5 is notebook available in 14 and 15.6 inches and comes with a silver scratch resistant exterior. It is considerably slim and is offered in both 10-point multi-touch and non-touch variants. The V5 comes with a HD display with a resolution of 1366×768 pixels and a webcam on top. The left consists of a power slot, the heat-sink, a proprietary slot to plug-in the adaptor for the Gigabit Ethernet port and the VGA port, an HDMI slot, a USB 3.0 port, two USB 2.0 ports and a 3.5 mm headphone jack.It also came out sometimearound late 2012 and early 2013

Aspire VX series

Aspire VX 15 
The Acer Aspire VX 15 specifications includes the use of either an Intel Core i5-7300HQ or an i7-7700HQ, 8 or 16GB DDR4 SDRAM, a 15.6" Full HD (1920 x 1080) 16:9 and either a NVIDIA GeForce GTX 1050 with 4 GB Dedicated Memory or a NVIDIA GeForce GTX 1050Ti with 4 GB Dedicated Memory.

Aspire VX 5 
The Acer Aspire VX 5 specifications includes the use of either an Intel Core i7-7700HQ, 8GB DDR4 SDRAM, single-channel, a 15.6" 16:9, 1920 x 1080 pixel 141 PPI HD and either a NVIDIA GeForce GTX 1050 Ti (Laptop) - 4096 MB, Core: 1493 - 1620 MHz.

Other models  

List of other Acer Aspire models

Other Acer Aspire branded laptops include the Aspire One Cloudbook.

Aspire 4720z 
Acer Aspire 4720z was a line of consumer laptops during 2006 to 2008. It featured Wireless B/G, Bluetooth, 5.1 audio output. These laptops were part of a class action lawsuit which claimed the laptops did not come with enough on-board RAM to run the pre-installed Windows Vista operating system.

Aspire 5738 
Acer Aspire 5738 is a dual-booting (Android and MS-Windows) 3D laptop, which includes Dynamic Digital Depth TriDef software.

The Acer Aspire 5738PG computer also includes the Acer multi-touch technology.

References

External links
 Acer Official Website

Acer Inc. laptops
Consumer electronics brands